Middle Crescent crater is a small crater in Mare Cognitum on the Moon.  The name of the crater was formally adopted by the IAU in 1973.

The Apollo 12 astronauts Pete Conrad and Alan Bean landed the Lunar Module (LM) Intrepid east of Middle Crescent crater on November 24, 1969.  To the southeast of Middle Crescent is Head crater.  Middle Crescent is the largest crater visited by the Apollo 12 astronauts.

Samples
Lunar sample 12004, an olivine basalt, was collected at the rim of Middle Crescent.  Samples 12014, 12015, and 12016 were probably collected there, but the provenance is less certain.  12014 is also an olivine basalt.  12015 is an olivine vitrophyre.  12016 is an ilmenite basalt.

References

Impact craters on the Moon
Apollo 12